Dum Kaata ( A Tale of a Tail!) is a Hindi-language comedy film directed by Amol Palekar and released in 2007. The film stars Om Puri, Anjana Basu, and Sachin Khedekar in lead roles. This film also includes supporting roles played by Shernaz Patel and Aseen Desai. The film was released in India and the UK in 2007 and released to the rest of the world in 2010.

Plot
This movie is the story of a young boy, Saumil (Khush Malik), who is diagnosed with a condition for which the doctor recommends an operation. Saumil refuses the operation, and his brother starts to believe he is growing a tail. Saumil and his brother Kashul (Aseen Desai), his mom (Shernaz Patel), his dad (Sachin Khedekar), his grandfather (Om Puri) must all come together in this time of need.

Cast
Om Puri
Jainam Shah
Viram Shah
Anjana Basu 
Sachin Khedekar
Shernaz Patel
Heli Daruwala as Imlee
Aseen Desai
Viju Khote
Vibhavari Deshpande as Ananya's mother
Saloni Daini as Gauri

References

External links
  Dum Kaata at Bollywood Hungama

2007 films
Indian children's comedy films
2000s Hindi-language films
2007 comedy films
Films directed by Amol Palekar
Hindi-language comedy films